Claudia Lilia Cruz Santiago (born 25 February 1967) is a Mexican politician from the Party of the Democratic Revolution. From 2006 to 2009 she served as Deputy of the LX Legislature of the Mexican Congress representing the Federal District.

References

1967 births
Living people
Politicians from Mexico City
Women members of the Chamber of Deputies (Mexico)
Party of the Democratic Revolution politicians
21st-century Mexican politicians
21st-century Mexican women politicians
Deputies of the LX Legislature of Mexico
Members of the Chamber of Deputies (Mexico) for Mexico City